Count Abdulla is an upcoming British horror comedy television series written by Kaamil Shah. It will premiere on ITVX in spring 2023 before airing on ITV at a later date.

Cast
 Arian Nik as Abdulla Khan
 Jaime Winstone as Kathy
 Manpreet Bambra as Amrita
 Sia Alipour as Shafi
 Jonny Green as Charles Ruthven
 Akshay Kumar as Rishi
 Moe Bar-El as Yazan Al Kawalti
 Mariska Ariya as Nahima
 Priya Davdra as Simran
 Rishi Nair as Majid
 Nikkita Chadha as Preethi
 Ruchika Jain as Jaswinder

Production
After graduating from London Film School in 2018, Kaamil Shah cold submitted his comedy pilot for Count Abdulla. He signed with an agent, and his script was picked up by Fudge Park Productions after garnering interest. ITV officially ordered the six-part horror comedy in March 2022 for the new ITVX streaming service's comedy slate.

It was announced in August 2022 that Arian Nik and Jaime Winstone would lead the series.

References

External links
 

2023 British television series debuts
British horror comedy television series
British Pakistani mass media
Fictional Muslims
ITV comedy
Television series about vampires